En-nun-tarah-ana of Uruk was the ninth Sumerian ruler in the First Dynasty of Uruk (ca. 26th century BC), according to the Sumerian King List, reigning for 8 years.

References

|-

See also

Uruk

Sumerian kings
26th-century BC Sumerian kings
Kings of Uruk